The Methodist Church of Peru is an autonomous affiliate church of the United Methodist Church. Founded in the 1870s, the denomination has approximately 32,000 members in 130 congregations. It is a member of the World Council of Churches.

History 
The first Methodist church was established in 1889 in Callao. In 1970, the denomination became independent and established six administrative districts.

Social issues 
The denomination ordains men and women as pastors. In 2015, the church agreed to discuss issues related to homosexuality and the blessing of same-sex unions and is considered to be among the progressive denominations in Peru.

References

External links
Methodist Church of Peru (Spanish)

Churches in Peru
United Methodist Church